Rontalizumab is a humanized monoclonal antibody being developed by Genentech. , it is being investigated in a clinical trial for the treatment of systemic lupus erythematosus.

References

Monoclonal antibodies